Deftones is the fourth studio album by American alternative metal band Deftones, released on May 20, 2003, by Maverick Records. The album features a broader spectrum of musical styles than the band's previous albums, ranging from some of their heaviest compositions to moody trip hop and shoegaze influences. It was the band's last album to be produced by Terry Date until Ohms in 2020, although he did produce their unreleased album Eros.

Background
Originally titled Lovers, the album was instead given an eponymous title because singer Chino Moreno considered Lovers too obvious in relation to the context of its material (the former title song "Lovers" did appear as an A-side and B-side on the UK "Hexagram" single). Date was frustrated by the very slow pace of the band working in the studio.

Musical style
Deftones is an eclectic album, with songs spanning many different ideas in diverse genres. It has a much different feel than prior efforts, due in part to Frank Delgado leaving his turntables behind and instead focusing on playing keyboards and synthesizers. Most of the album's songs make extensive use of the band's low G# tuning and Moreno's high screams, resulting in some of the heaviest songs in the band's catalog. On the other hand, the track "Lucky You" is a dark, soft, trip hop-influenced piece featuring DJ Crook from Moreno's side project Team Sleep and vocalist Rey Osburn of Tinfed. A grand piano and toy piano were featured in the mournful "Anniversary of an Uninteresting Event."

In addition to trip hop influences, significant shoegaze elements have been noted on the album, especially in regards to the song "Minerva".

Promotion
Deftones produced two singles, "Minerva" and "Hexagram." Music videos were shot for both singles as well as the track "Bloody Cape", which was also intended to be a single, but was released in limited editions for promotional purposes only. The latter's video was only available on the band's official website for one day, but was later released on the DVD portion of the band's B-Sides & Rarities. As the lead single, "Minerva" featured a melodic, commercially viable sound and gained strong rotation on mainstream rock video programming. In contrast, the extreme heaviness of "Hexagram" landed it on shows such as Uranium and Headbangers Ball.

"Battle-Axe" was featured in the video game Ghost Recon Advanced Warfighter 2, while "Minerva" was featured in True Crime: Streets of LA, NHL 2004, House of Wax, and also as downloadable content for the Rock Band series.

Critical reception

Deftones was well received by critics, earning an aggregate rating of 74 on Metacritic.

Q praised the album, giving it 4.5 out of 5 stars, stating, "In a genre considered creatively bankrupt, this is genuinely new metal". Rolling Stone stated, "This is metal that crushes, then soothes; collapses, then soars... Deftones just blow open the possibilities". Reviewers from sites such The A.V. Club and AllMusic gave the album positive scores but criticized the band for returning to their heavy style, instead of the more soft and artistic style of its predecessor, White Pony.

Spin magazine also give it a positive score, but complained about the album's notable darkness, saying, "On their fourth album, Deftones are sad as hell, and they're not gonna take it anymore; this is less an 11-song album than a single long-form mope". Playlouder's mixed review praised the band's musicianship, but criticized Moreno's high, screamed vocals.

In 2016, Jonathan Dick of NPR Music retrospectively noted the album's "trip-hop nuances" and included the album as an example of Deftones' varied catalogue, stating that "Deftones' catalogue reads like a case study in how a band can translate influences into a sound that's definitively their own." The track "Minerva" was placed at spot number 12 in Consequence of Sound's article "The Top 20 Deftones Song," with Jon Hadusek claiming that "[in] a way, Deftones brought shoegaze to the alternative metal mainstream with 'Minerva', a crushingly heavy, textured jam indebted to Siamese Dream-era Smashing Pumpkins and Hum [...]" Hadusek further stated that the track was "far-and-away the best track" of the self-titled album and that the track "hints at the dreamier directions" that Deftones would continue to explore.

Commercial performance
This album sold 167,000 copies in its first week of release in America, debuting at No. 2 on the Billboard 200, behind Staind's 14 Shades of Grey. It was the highest-charting album to date by the band, and went on to sell over 492,000 copies in the U.S by 2005. It was certified gold by the RIAA two months after its release. The album also debuted at No. 1 on the Canadian Albums Chart, selling 10,700 copies in its first week of release in Canada.

Track listing

Personnel 
Deftones
Chino Moreno – lead vocals, rhythm guitar
Stephen Carpenter – lead guitar, drums on "Anniversary of an Uninteresting Event", bass on “Needles and Pins”
Chi Cheng – bass, backing vocals
Frank Delgado –  keyboards
Abe Cunningham – drums

Production
Terry Date – production, engineering and mixing
Greg Wells – co-production and arrangement
Kinski Gallo – additional photography
Sam Hofstedt – assistant engineering
Frank Maddocks – art direction and design
James R. Minchin III – band photography
Rey Osburn – additional vocals (on "Lucky You")
Pete Roberts – Pro Tools engineering and additional engineering
Nick Spanos – additional photography
Sean Tallman – assistant engineering
Tom Baker – mastering

Charts

Weekly charts

Year-end charts

Singles

Certifications

References

Deftones albums
2003 albums
Maverick Records albums
Albums produced by Terry Date